Azerbaijan participated in the Junior Eurovision Song Contest 2018 in Minsk, Belarus. The Azerbaijani entry was selected through an internal selection. On 18 September 2018 it was revealed that Fidan Huseynova would represent Azerbaijan in the contest.

Background
Azerbaijan debuted in the Junior Eurovision Song Contest in 2012. In 2008, İTV announced that Azerbaijan would take part in the Junior Eurovision Song Contest 2008 in Limassol, but then withdrew before the contest, because there were too few candidates for the national selection and consequently canceled its debut.

After taking part in the Junior Eurovision Song Contest 2013, Azerbaijan withdrew from the contest because of unspecified reasons and on 25 July 2018, it was announced that Azerbaijan will return to the contest in 2018.

Artist and song information

Fidan Huseynova

Fidan Huseynova (born 24 November 2005 in Moscow) is a Russian-born Azerbaijani child singer. She represented Azerbaijan at the Junior Eurovision Song Contest 2018 with the song "I Wanna Be Like You". In 2021, she won the "Song of the Year" award at Zahara Kids Music Awards for her song "Bubble gum".

At Junior Eurovision
During the opening ceremony and the running order draw which both took place on 19 November 2018, Azerbaijan was drawn to perform seventh on 25 November 2018, following Netherlands and preceding Belarus.

Voting

Detailed voting results

References

Junior Eurovision Song Contest
Azerbaijan
2018